Mera Saaya is a 1966 Indian Hindi-language thriller film directed by Raj Khosla. The music is by Madan Mohan and lyrics by Raja Mehdi Ali Khan. The film stars Sunil Dutt and Sadhana.  This is director Raj Khosla's third film with Sadhana after Ek Musafir Ek Hasina (1962) and Woh Kaun Thi? (1964).  The film became a box office success. It is a remake of the Marathi film Pathlaag (The Chase).

Manohar Amberkar won the Filmfare Best Sound Award.

Plot 

Thakur Rakesh Singh, an affluent descendant of the royalty, is a lawyer and happily married to Geeta for three years. He goes to London for higher studies and after one year receives the news of his wife's illness. He immediately comes back only to witness his wife's death in his hands. He builds a small memorial in her memory in his mansion. He deeply mourns her by always sitting at that memorial and listening to recorded songs sung by Geeta.

While things are like this, one day a police inspector Daljit comes to meet him. He explains to him about the bandit they caught on the other day, Raina who claims to be the wife of Rakesh. Rakesh meets her and gets shocked as she looks exactly like Geeta. But he rejects that she was his wife as he saw his wife dying and buried her with his own hands. But that woman claims that she was indeed Geeta and tells him about intimate moments they shared. Rakesh gets surprised but suspects some mischief.

The case proceeds in the court and Rakesh starts to cross-examine that woman. She answers every question correctly and claims that she was kidnapped by someone two to three days before her arrest. When Rakesh asks why she has no mangala sutra on her, which was a compulsory ornament for married Hindu women, she tells him that she removed it before going out on that day. He wouldn't believe that, as Geeta would consider mangala sutra very sacred and wouldn't have removed it.

After some drama, he asks her about her diary, which Geeta always keeps near to her and she fails to answer. He decides that she was just an impostor and asks the court to convict her. She becomes emotionally unstable after all this drama and ends up in a mental institute. One night, she escapes from there and comes to Rakesh's house. There, she explains to Rakesh all that has happened.

Geeta had a twin sister named Nisha, who was a bandit just like their mother. Geeta hides the fact about her criminal family and marries Rakesh. But one day her sister comes to her in a pitiable condition and asks her to give her shelter for one night. Geeta, seeing her sick get out of her house to buy medicine. But she doesn't want other family members to know about Nisha and makes Nisha dress like her and even gives her own mangalsutra to Nisha. But when she comes out, Ranjit singh, Nisha's husband mistakes her for Nisha and takes her away without giving her a chance to talk. When Ranjit Singh discovers that she wasn't Nisha, he wants to take her back, but police arrest them on their way back. While she was explaining all this to Rakesh, Ranjit Singh comes there and confirms her story. Police shoot him and he dies at Nisha's memorial. Rakesh and Geeta reconcile and start their regular life.

Cast 
 Sunil Dutt as Thakur Rakesh Singh
 Sadhana Shivdasani as Geeta / Raina (aka Nisha)
 Shivraj as Family Doctor
 K.N. Singh as Prosecuting Lawyer
 Anwar Hussain as Inspector Daljit
 Prem Chopra as Daku Suryavar Singh / Ranjit Singh
 Manmohan as Doctor (in mental hospital)
 Dhumal as Bankeji
 Mukri as Munshiji
 Jagdish Sethi as Judge

Music 
The music for the film is composed by Madan Mohan. The song "Nainon Mein Badra Chhaaye" which is based on Raag Bhimpalasi (known as Abheri in Carnatic Music) and sung by Lata Mangeshkar has a rendition of Sitar and won Madan Mohan the "Sur Singar" Award for the best classical song for the year 1966. The haunting title track "Tu Jahaan Jahaan Chalegaa, Mera Saaya Saath Hoga" sung by Lata Mangeshkar appears twice in the film & remains a classic. Asha Bhosle's song "Jhumka Gira Re" also became very popular. It secured 4th spot in the annual top chart of Binaca Geetmala.

All lyrics were written by Raja Mehdi Ali Khan.

References

External links 
 

1960s Hindi-language films
1966 films
Films directed by Raj Khosla
Films scored by Madan Mohan
Hindi remakes of Marathi films
Indian thriller films